The Town Ground was a cricket ground in Coalville, Leicestershire. The ground was used as an outground by Leicestershire in 1950, with Leicestershire playing one first-class match there against Warwickshire in the County Championship. Despite a century from Leicestershire's Charles Palmer (143), Warwickshire won the match by 6 wickets, thanks in part to Abdul Hafeez Kardar's 5 for 25 in Leicestershire's second innings of 83 all out.

See also
List of Leicestershire County Cricket Club grounds
List of cricket grounds in England and Wales

References

Defunct cricket grounds in England
Cricket grounds in Leicestershire
North West Leicestershire District
Defunct sports venues in Leicestershire
Leicestershire County Cricket Club